Lo Mejor is a compilation album by The Lebrón Brothers, released in 1992.

Track listing

Reception 
 Allmusic:

External links 
 [ Allmusic]

1992 greatest hits albums
LeBrón Brothers albums